Daniell Peninsula is the large peninsula between Cape Daniell and Cape Jones on the coast of Victoria Land. It is partly separated from the Victory Mountains by Whitehall Glacier, which is afloat in its lower reaches, but is joined to these mountains by the higher land in the vicinity of Mount Prior. It was named by the New Zealand Geological Survey Antarctic Expedition, 1957–58, after Cape Daniell, and by analogy with the Adare and Hallett peninsulas.

Geology
The peninsula is an elongated basalt dome similar to the Adare and Hallett peninsulas. It consists of at least four overlapping shield volcanoes that form part of the Hallett Volcanic Province of the McMurdo Volcanic Group. K–Ar or Rb–Sr dating has given an age of 12.4 ± 0.2 million years for Mount Brewster pantelleritic trachyte and an age of 6.9 ± 0.3 million years for Mount Brewster hawaiite lava.

A second shield volcano forming the southern end of the peninsula is deeply dissected by the Mandible Cirque. It contains the small satellite vent of Tousled Peak and the prominent ice-draped cone-like peak of Mount Lubbock. A dike cutting Mandible Cirque comenditic trachyte has given an age of 9.5 ± 0.1 million years.

The summit area contains a flat region several kilometres wide that might be a small ice-filled caldera. Cape Daniell trachyte lava has an age of 5.8 ± 0.1 million years while Cape Daniell benmoreite lava has an age of 5.6 ± 0.5 million years.

References

Peninsulas of Antarctica
Landforms of Victoria Land
Borchgrevink Coast
Volcanoes of Victoria Land
Miocene shield volcanoes